Daniłówka may refer to the following places in Poland:

Daniłówka Druga
Daniłówka Pierwsza